Marquitos may refer to:
Marquitos (footballer, born 1933)
Marquitos (footballer, born 1938)
Marquitos (footballer, born 1987)